Viswasapoorvam Mansoor is a 2017 Indian Malayalam-language film written and directed by P. T. Kunju Muhammed. It stars Roshan Mathew, Prayaga Martin, Asha Sarath, and Zarina Wahab. The film was released in Kerala on 24 June 2017.

Cast
 Roshan Mathew as Mansoor
 Prayaga Martin as Mumthaz
 Asha Sarath as Fathibi
 Zarina Wahab as Saira Bhanu
 Renji Panicker as Kalanthan Haji
 Akash V H as Firoz
 V. K. Sreeraman
 Leona Lishoy as Soumya
 Santhosh Keezhattoor
 Sunil Sukhada
 Shivaji Guruvayoor
 Rahaneesh Bin Rafeeque

Production
Roshan Mathew and Prayaga Martin were signed to play the lead pair, along with Gautami and Swetha Menon. However, the latter left due to prior commitments in television shows and was replaced by Asha Sarath. Zarina Wahab was signed to play the role of Saira Bhanu. Principal photography began in February 2017 in Thalassery.

Soundtrack

The film features a soundtrack composed by Ramesh Narayan, with lyrics penned by Premdas Guruvayur, Prabha Varma and Rafeeq Ahammed. The songs were released on 7 June 2017 by Mathrubhumi Music via Kappa TV's YouTube channel. The song "Poi Maranja Kalam" won K. J. Yesudas a National Film Award for Best Male Playback Singer at the 65th National Film Awards.

References

External links
 

2010s Malayalam-language films
2017 films
Films about Islam